"The short assize" (French court assize = "short sitting") is H. J. R. Murray's name for a chess variant that was played in medieval Europe. It was somewhat like sittuyin but developed independently, probably to get the armies into contact sooner. It was current in England and Paris in the second half of the 12th century, and perhaps at other times and/or places.

The pieces started with the pawns on the third ranks, and the queen on the same square as the e-file pawn. These two pieces could not be moved together, and after that no two pieces of the same color could be on the same square together. But, before either moved, both could be captured together. After that, the usual rules of medieval chess (i.e. shatranj or similar) applied.

Murray records these two starting positions, and writes as if the players could choose the starting positions of their kings and bishops and knights and rooks. It is not known if the game had an initial setting-up stage like in sittuyin.

The ordinary European chess of the time was sometimes called the long assize to distinguish.

Compare
Sittuyin (Burmese traditional chess)
Chess960

References
 H. J. R. Murray (1913). A History of Chess. .

Games related to chaturanga